The Rossio Railway Station is a railway station in Lisbon, Portugal, located in the Rossio square. The station was formerly known as Estação Central (Central Station) and that designation still appears in its façade.

History 
The station was commissioned by the Portuguese Royal Railway Company and was designed between 1886 and 1887 by Portuguese architect José Luís Monteiro.  It was built in one of the most important squares of Lisbon, the Rossio, and connected the city to the region of Sintra.

The tunnel was excavated under the city and is considered one of the most important works of engineering in Portugal dating from the 19th century.  It was completed in 1890, and soon after Lisbon's Circle Line with a connection to the North Line also opened. The station became Lisbon's main passenger terminus until 1957, from that date only a few long-distance trains terminated at Rossio, mainly West Line services, until the early 1990s.

Sidónio Pais, the fourth President of Portugal, was assassinated in Rossio Station in December 1918.

The station was closed to rail services from 22 October 2004 until 12 February 2008 due to tunnel renewal work.

Architecture 

The Neo-Manueline façade dominates the northwest side of the square and is a Romantic recreation of the exuberant Manueline style, typical of early 16th century Portugal. Its most interesting features are the two intertwined horseshoe portals at the entrance, the clock in a small turret and the abundant sculptural decoration. Inside, the platforms are connected by ramps to the façade level and are covered by a cast-iron structure executed by a Belgian firm. The station is an important example of Romantic (façade) and cast-iron (platform cover) architecture in Portugal.

The western wall of the train shed has a series of tiled pictures mixing classic religious themes with modern views of Lisbon.

On 3 May 2016, a 126-year-old statue of Sebastian of Portugal that stood in a niche between the entrance portals was accidentally destroyed by a person who knocked it over by climbing up for a photograph. The person was arrested.

See also
Gare do Oriente
Lisbon Metro

References

Railway stations in Lisbon
Railway stations opened in 1891
1891 establishments in Portugal